Michael Pittman Jr. (born October 5, 1997) is an American football wide receiver for the Indianapolis Colts of the National Football League (NFL). He played college football at USC, where he was named a consensus second-team All-American as a senior, and was selected by the Colts in the second round of the 2020 NFL Draft.

Early life and high school
Pittman grew up in Southern California and attended Valencia High School as a freshman, and Oaks Christian School in Westlake Village, California for his sophomore, junior, and senior year. As a senior, He caught 81 passes for 1,990 yards and 24 touchdowns and was named first-team All-America by Parade and Max Preps and participated in the All-American Bowl. In the final game of his high school career, Pittman caught 16 passes for 354 yards and five touchdowns. Rated a four star recruit, Pittman initially committed to play college football for the UCLA Bruins. He re-opened his recruitment in the summer of 2015 and ultimately committed to play at the University of Southern California over Oregon.

College career
Pittman enrolled at USC in the spring of 2016 after graduating from Oaks Christian a semester early. As a true freshman, he caught 6 passes for 82 yards on offense while returning two punts for 63 yards, four kickoffs for 31 yards, blocking punt and forcing a fumble on special teams. In his sophomore season, he had 23 receptions for 404 yards and two touchdowns with a punt returned for a touchdown and a blocked punt on special teams. Pittman was named the Pac-12 Conference Special Teams Player of the Week for Week 12 after returning a punt 72 yards for a touchdown against UCLA and was named first-team All-Conference as a special teamer.

As junior, Pittman was named honorable mention All-Pac-12 Conference after posting 41 receptions for 758 yards with six touchdowns. Following the end of the season, Pittman considered forgoing his final season of eligibility to enter the 2019 NFL Draft but opted to return for his senior year after receiving a third-round grade from the NFL Draft Advisory Board. Pittman caught 10 passes for 232 yards (5th-most in a game in USC history) and a touchdown in a 30–23 win over tenth-ranked Utah on September 20, 2019. Pittman finished the season with 101 receptions for 1,275 yards and 11 touchdowns and was named first-team All-Pac-12 and a consensus second-team All-America selection. He was also a finalist for the Fred Biletnikoff Award and won the Pop Warner Award, given to the college senior with the biggest impact on and off the field.

Professional career

2020 season
Pittman was selected by the Indianapolis Colts in the second round with the 34th overall pick in the 2020 NFL Draft. Pittman made his professional debut on September 13, 2020 against the Jacksonville Jaguars, catching two passes for ten yards in the 27–20 loss. He was placed on injured reserve on October 3, 2020, due to compartment syndrome in his calf. He was activated on October 31. In Week 9 against the Baltimore Ravens, he caught 4 passes for 56 yard in a 24-10 loss to the Ravens. He had his first 100-yard game with seven receptions for 101 yards in the 34–17 victory against the Tennessee Titans in Week 10 on Thursday Night Football. He was the first Colts' rookie to have 100 receiving yards in a game since Donte Moncrief in 2014. In Week 11 against the Green Bay Packers, Pittman caught 3 passes for 66 yards and his first career touchdown reception on a 45 yard pass play in a 34–31 victory. Pittman finished his rookie season with 40 catches for 503 yards.

2021 season

In a Week 2 loss against the Los Angeles Rams, Pittman had a career game, hauling in 8 passes for 123 yards. Pittman scored his second career touchdown in a 31-25 loss to the Baltimore Ravens, finishing with 6 receptions for 89 yards. Continuing to carve out a big role in the Colts' offense, Pittman hit 100 receiving yards for the third time in his career in a Week 7 Sunday Night Football matchup against the San Francisco 49ers. He caught 4 passes for 105 yards, including a touchdown catch that sealed the Colts' 30-18 win.  In the following week's overtime loss against the Tennessee Titans, Pittman recorded 10 receptions on 15 targets for 86 yards, also scoring 2 touchdowns within a minute. His targets, receptions, and touchdowns were all career-highs. In a Week 14 win against the New England Patriots, Pittman was ejected in the third quarter for his involvement in a fight with Patriots safety Kyle Dugger. On December 23, 2021, Pittman was named a 2022 Pro Bowl alternate. In the Colts' Week 17 loss against the Las Vegas Raiders, Pittman broke 1,000 receiving yards on the season and became the sixth Colts' pass catcher since 2000 to do so.

NFL career statistics

Regular season

Postseason

Personal life
Pittman is the son of former NFL running back and Super Bowl champion Michael Pittman and Kristin Randall.  Pittman Sr. played on the Tampa Bay Buccaneers 2002 championship roster. His younger brother, Mycah Pittman, plays wide receiver for the Florida State Seminoles. Pittman also runs a YouTube channel with his wife, Kianna Galli, called "Michael Pittman Jr". He is most popular on YouTube for his "Gameday Vlogs" and "Road to the draft" Series. On May 27, 2021, Pittman and his wife welcomed their first child, Mila. Pittman is a Christian.

References

External links
His Instagram Page
USC Trojans bio
Indianapolis Colts bio

1997 births
Living people
American football wide receivers
People from Woodland Hills, Los Angeles
Players of American football from Los Angeles
USC Trojans football players
Indianapolis Colts players